The libeccio  (Leveche ;  ;  ; ;) is the westerly or south-westerly wind which predominates in northern Corsica all year round; it frequently raises high seas and may give violent westerly squalls. In summer it is most persistent, but in winter it alternates with the Tramontane (north-east or north). The word libeccio is Italian, coming from Greek through Latin, and originally means "Libyan".

See also

Bora (wind)
Etesian
Gregale
Khamaseen
Levantades
Leveche
Marin (wind)
Mistral (wind)
Sirocco
Lodos

Notes

References

External links

Local Mediterranean winds
Name of Winds

Climate of Italy
Climate of Greece
Climate of Malta
Climate of Spain
Winds